Jane Hill (born 1969) is a British newsreader.

Jane Hill may also refer to:
 
 Jane Hill (ecologist), British-born academic
 Jane Hill (politician) (1936–2015), Australian politician
 Jane H. Hill (1939–2018), American anthropologist

See also
 Hill (surname)
 Hill (disambiguation)